Karancsberény  is a village in Nógrád County, Northern Hungary region, Hungary.

References 

Populated places in Nógrád County